Stefano Tarolli (born 18 August 1997) is an Italian footballer who plays as a goalkeeper for amateur side Di Benedetto Trinitapoli.

Club career
On 1 February 2015, he joined Piacenza, on loan.

He made his Serie B debut for Foggia on 26 November 2017 in a game against Bari.

On 24 January 2019, he moved on another loan to Renate.

On 31 January 2020, he joined Serie D club Fidelis Andria.

On 28 September 2020 he signed with Serie C club Arezzo.

References

External links
 

1997 births
Sportspeople from Foggia
Footballers from Apulia
Living people
Italian footballers
Calcio Foggia 1920 players
Piacenza Calcio 1919 players
Manfredonia Calcio players
A.C. Renate players
S.S. Fidelis Andria 1928 players
S.S. Arezzo players
Serie B players
Serie C players
Serie D players
Association football goalkeepers
Virtus Francavilla Calcio players